Christine Horne (born December 14, 1981, in Aurora, Ontario) is a Canadian actress who co-starred with Ellen Burstyn in the movie The Stone Angel.

She received her BFA in Theatre at York University in 2004 and has since become an established stage actor in Toronto. She has been nominated for three Dora Mavor Moore Awards for Outstanding Performance by a Female in a Principal Role, and won in 2010 for her role as The Governess in The Turn of the Screw.

Filmography

Film

Television

References

External links
 

1981 births
Canadian film actresses
Living people
People from Aurora, Ontario
York University alumni
Canadian stage actresses
Actresses from Ontario